The  is a technological museum and exhibition hall located in the city of Nagoya, Aichi Prefecture, Japan.

History 
The museum is sponsored by Chubu Electric Power and was opened in 1986.

Exhibitions
The museum houses on the first four floors the history and development of electricity, and the usage of it throughout time until today. It also houses a concert hall and auditorium in the upper floors. Regular workshops for children are organised, where they can learn how to construct small, moveable toys, which are sponsored by companies such as Tamiya Corporation.

See also
 List of museums in Japan

References

External links 

Chubu Electric Power | Electricity Museum

Museums established in 1986
1986 establishments in Japan
Museums in Nagoya
Science museums in Japan
Chubu Electric Power